Lophiotoma panglaoensis is a species of sea snail, a marine gastropod mollusk in the family Turridae, the turrids.

Description

Distribution
This marine species occurs off Papua New Guinea and Luzon, the Philippines.

References

 Olivera. 2004. Larger forms in Lophiotoma defined: Four new species described from the Philippines and three from elsewhere in the Indo-Pacific. Science Diliman, 16 (1) : 1-28

panglaoensis
Gastropods described in 2004